Amos Lake is a lake in Douglas County, in the U.S. state of Minnesota.

Amos Lake was named for Amos Johnson.

See also
List of lakes in Minnesota

References

Lakes of Minnesota
Lakes of Douglas County, Minnesota